Abra Cadabra (born 3 May 1997) is a British rapper and singer from Tottenham, London. He is a member of the UK drill group OFB.

Abra Cadabra debuted his first track, "Man Down", in September 2015. He then went on to star in a platform called "BlackBox" in March 2016, and released a freestyle called "Robbery", which was later premiered as a single in July 2016. He is most known for his single "On Deck", which was released in July 2020.

Career 
Abra Cadabra was born in London. He started his music career at the age of 18, releasing his first song, "Man Down", in 2015.

In July 2020, he released "On Deck". It peaked at number 32 on the UK Singles Chart.

Discography

EPs

Mixtapes

Singles

As lead artist

As featured artist

Awards and nominations

References 

Living people
People from Tottenham
Rappers from London
English male rappers
UK drill musicians
Black British musicians
Gangsta rappers
1997 births